Knut Lennart Herbert Brunnhage (25 August 1915 – 29 March 1999) was a Swedish diver who won a silver medal in the 10 m platform at the 1947 European Championships. Next year he finished fourth in this event at the 1948 Olympics.

References

1915 births
1999 deaths
Swedish male divers
Olympic divers of Sweden
Divers at the 1948 Summer Olympics
People from Sotenäs Municipality
Sportspeople from Västra Götaland County
20th-century Swedish people